The Daytime Emmy Award for Outstanding Special Class Special is an Emmy Award given to "single original program." Fiction, non-fiction, music, and variety events are all eligible for this single category. Categories similar to this have been awarded since the Daytime Emmys early years.

Winners and nominees 
Winners in bold

Outstanding Special Class Special

2000's 
2000
 Macy's Thanksgiving Day Parade (NBC)
 Film Preservation Classics with Billy Bob Thornton (AMC)
 World Aids Day '99 (MTV)
 Great Performances ("From Vienna: The New Year's Celebration 1999") (PBS)
 MTV Uncensored (MTV)
2001
 Reel Models: The First Women of Film (AMC)
 Macy's Thanksgiving Day Parade (NBC)
 Against All Odds: AMC's Tribute to Hollywood's Disabled (AMC)
 Film Preservation Classics with Jodie Foster (AMC)
 MTV Movie Awards (MTV)
2002
 Beyond Tara: The Extraordinary Life of Hattie McDaniel (AMC)
 Macy's Thanksgiving Day Parade (NBC)
 A Prayer for America: Yankee Stadium Memorial (SYN)
 Call to Action: An Untold Story of 9/11 (AMC)
 Live from Lincoln Center ("The Chamber Music Society of Lincoln Center: An Evening of Beethoven") (PBS)
2003
 Hollywood Rocks the Movies ("The 1970s") (AMC)
 Tournament of Roses Parade
 Macy's Thanksgiving Day Parade (NBC)
 Behind the Scenes of This Old House (PBS)
 Opening Ceremony Salt Lake Paralympic Winter Games (NBC)
2004
 Macy's Thanksgiving Day Parade (NBC)
 Tournament of Roses Parade (SYN)
 9/11 Memorial from Ground Zero (SYN)
 The Another World Reunion (SOAPnet)
 Live from Lincoln Center ("The Complete Brandenburg Concertos") (PBS)
2005
 9/11 Memorial from Ground Zero (SYN)
 The Brady Bunch 35th Anniversary Reunion Special: Still Brady After All These Years (TV Land)
 An Evening with Scott Hamilton & Friends (NBC)
 Macy's Thanksgiving Day Parade (NBC)
 Walt Disney World Christmas Day Parade (ABC)
2006
 Walt Disney World Christmas Day Parade (ABC)
 Tournament of Roses Parade
 Macy's Thanksgiving Day Parade (NBC)
 9/11 Memorial from Ground Zero (SYN)
 SOAPnet Reveals ABC Soap Secrets (SOAPnet)
2007
 A Question of Life or Meth (A&E)
 Tournament of Roses Parade
 9/11 Memorial from Ground Zero (SYN)
 Macy's Thanksgiving Day Parade (NBC)
 Walt Disney World Christmas Day Parade (ABC)
2008
 America's Invisible Children: The Homeless Education Crisis in America (CW)
 Legally Blonde: The Musical (MTV)
 Macy's Thanksgiving Day Parade (NBC)
 Walt Disney World Christmas Day Parade (ABC)
 Who's Who of World Giving (CW)
2009
 Macy's Thanksgiving Day Parade (NBC)
 Clean House ("The Messiest Home In The Country") (Style)
 11th Annual Ribbon of Hope Celebration (Here TV)
 Life on the Edge: A Global Crisis (FOX Reality)
 Walt Disney World Christmas Day Parade (ABC)

2010's 
2010
 Clean House ("The Messiest Home In The Country") (Style)
 On the Edge: The Poverty Crisis in Africa (FOX Reality)
 We Are One: The Obama Inaugural Celebration at the Lincoln Memorial (HBO)
2011
 New Orleans: Getting Back to Normal (APT)
  mtvU's Stand In with John Legend (MTVU)
 Macy's Thanksgiving Day Parade (NBC)
 Private Sessions ("Sting at Red Rocks") (A&E)
 The Rally to Restore Sanity and/or Fear (Comedy Central)
2012
 Style Exposed ("Baring It All") (Style)
 30 Years From Here (Here TV)
 Thanksgiving Live! (Food Network)
 The Joni Show ("Holocaust: From Horror to Hope") (Daystar)
 Style Exposed ("Sperm Donor") (Style)
 President Obama’s 2011 Race To The Top Commencement Challenge (MTV 2)
2013
 Guy Fieri's Family Reunion (Food Network)
 Macy's Thanksgiving Day Parade (NBC)
 Giada at Home ("The Royal Treatment") (Food Network)
2014
 The Young and the Restless ("Jeanne Cooper Tribute") (CBS)
 A World of Dreams: Voices From the OUT100 (Here TV)
 Disney Parks Christmas Day Parade (ABC)
 mun2 News Special ("Hecho en America") (mun2)
2015
 Laverne Cox Presents: The T Word (MTV)
 E! Breaking News: Joan Rivers (E! Entertainment)
 Taco Trip (Cooking)
 Thanksgiving at Bobby’s (Food Network)
2016 
 Matt Shepard Is a Friend of Mine (Logo)
 30th Independent Spirit Awards (IFC)
 Barefoot in L.A. (Food Network)
 R.L. Stine's Monsterville: Cabinet of Souls (Netflix)
 White People (MTV)
2017
 Out of Iraq (Logo)
 MTV Docs ("Transformation") (MTV)
 Bookaboo ("Bookaboo's Barkin' New Year's Eve") (Amazon)
 The Wildlife Docs ("Africa") (ABC)
 Disney Parks Magical Christmas Celebration (ABC)
2018
Kevyn Aucoin: Beauty & the Beast in Me (Logo)
 Macy's Thanksgiving Day Parade (NBC)
 An American Girl Story ("Ivy & Julie 1976: A Happy Balance") (Amazon)
 Bean (Fuse)
 I’m With The Banned (VICELAND)
 Skyward (Amazon)
2019
Quiet Heroes (Logo)
 Light in the Water (Logo)
 A Long Road to Freedom: The Advocate Celebrates 50 Years (Here TV)
 Macy's Thanksgiving Day Parade (NBC)
 Super Soul Sunday ("Oprah's Book Club: Freedom After 30 Years on Death Row") (OWN)

2020's 
2020
Sesame Street's 50th Anniversary Celebration (HBO)
 Hate Among Us (Popstar TV)
 Macy's Thanksgiving Day Parade (NBC)
 This Old House ("40th Anniversary Special") (PBS)
 The Young and the Restless ("Kristoff St. John Tribute") (CBS)
2021
Space Launch Live: America Returns to Space (Discovery and Science Channel)
 94th Annual Macy’s Thanksgiving Day Parade (NBC)
 2020 Film Independent Spirit Awards (IFC)
 David Blaine Ascension (YouTube Originals)
 Jeopardy! The Greatest of All Time (Syndicated)

References 

Special Class Special